Numerous Christian monasteries have existed in the territory that is now County Tipperary in Ireland, some founded in the Celtic Christian period and more after the reforms of Saint Malachy. The Reformation in Ireland saw the dissolution of the monasteries, but after the easing of the Penal Laws against Roman Catholicism new ones were opened.

Notes

References

See also
List of monastic houses in Ireland

Tipperary
Monastic houses
Monastic houses
Monastic houses